The 1985 Summer Universiade, also known as the XIII Summer Universiade, took place in Kobe, Japan.

Mascot

The mascot of the Kobe Universiade, "Unitan", designed by Osamu Tezuka, is a red-crested white crane, symbolic of Japan and a good omen. The name was chosen from some 8,000 suggestions received from throughout the country. The name is derived from a combination of 'uni' from 'Universiade' and 'tan' from the Japanese name for red-crested crane, namely 'tancho-tsuru'.

Gender test
The sex chromatin test was used at these games to decide on participants' gender; Spanish hurdler Maria José Martínez-Patiño was declared a man and thus ruled ineligible for the women's events. In agreement with officials who suggested she fake an injury so she could withdraw without publicity, she complied. She later fought, successfully, to have that diagnosis reversed.

Sports

Medal table

References

 
Summer World University Games
U
Summer Universiade
U
Multi-sport events in Japan
Sports competitions in Kobe
Summer Universiade
Summer Universiade